Rattlesnake Bite is the Finnish rock band Smack's second studio album. It was released in 1985. A remastered version released in 1998 included 5 bonus tracks.

Track list

Original album 
 "Stepping Stone" (Boyce, Hart) 2:37
 "Roses Have Faded" 3:58
 "Nearby the Hangingtree" 3:20
 "Rattlesnake Bite" (Manchuria, Rane, Claude) 3:24
 "Somewhere Out of the Day" 3:53
 "Weird Is the Sea" 2:48
 "Pass That Bottle" 2:27
 "Shade of the Blade" 4:37
 "Oh Lord" 3:10
 "On the Run" 2:58
 "Ice Drops" 2:57

1998 bonus tracks 
 "Paint It Black" (Mick Jagger, Keith Richards) 3:15
 "Black Bird" (Manchuria, Claude) 3:41
 "Buy This Town" (Manchuria, Claude) 3:09
 "Maggie McGill" (Live) (Jim Morrison) 4:33
 "Search and Destroy" (Live) (Iggy Pop, James Williamson)

Single
 " Stepping Stone " (Boyce/Hart) 2:37
 " Somewhere Out Of The Day " (Manchuria, Claude) 3:53

Line-up 
 Claude – vocals
 Manchuria – guitar
 Rane – guitar
 Cheri – bass
 Kinde – drums

External links 
 Smack

1985 albums
Smack (Finnish band) albums